Bélesta is a commune in the Pyrénées-Orientales department in southern France.

Geography

Localisation 
Bélesta is located in the canton of La Vallée de l'Agly and in the arrondissement of Perpignan.

Government and politics 
Mayors

Population

Sites of interest 
 Prehistory museum
 Bélesta dolmen
 Bélesta cave
 Church of Saint Barthelemy in Bélesta
 Church of Saint Barthelemy in Jonqueroles
 Llébrès, an abandoned medieval hamlet
 Caladroy, hamlet with Château de Caladroy and an important winery

See also
Communes of the Pyrénées-Orientales department

References

Communes of Pyrénées-Orientales
Fenouillèdes